The Hawk is a 1993 British film starring Helen Mirren, George Costigan, Rosemary Leach, Owen Teale and Melanie Hill.

Plot
The film tells the story of a serial killer, known by the police as The Hawk, who preys on women in the North of England. He sexually assaults the victims before striking them with a hammer and picking out their insides, like a hawk, hence his nickname.

Meanwhile, Annie Marsh (Helen Mirren) is a housewife living in the area of where the killings are taking place, with her husband, Stephen (George Costigan) and their two young children. Stephen is often away on business, but Annie soon notices that he is away whenever the killer strikes. To make matters worse, Annie was once institutionalized due to a mental illness. Is she crazy? Or is her husband a knife-wielding murderer?

Cast
 Helen Mirren as Annie Marsh
 George Costigan as Stephen Marsh
 Rosemary Leach as Mrs. Marsh
 Owen Teale as Ken Marsh
 Melanie Hill as Norma

Reception
The film opened in the UK on 3 December 1993 on 44 screens and grossed £58,429 for the weekend, placing 12th at the UK box office. In the United States and Canada it grossed $8,906.

Reference list

External links
 The Hawk at the Internet Movie Database

1993 films
British thriller films
Films directed by David Hayman
1990s English-language films
1990s British films